KQSK 97.5 FM is a country music station in northwest Nebraska. It is licensed to Chadron, Nebraska. It is owned by Eagle Communications, Inc., and licensee held by Double Q Country.

It simulcasts KAAQ FM 105.9 in Alliance, Nebraska.

External links
 KQSK
 KCOW
 

QSK
Country radio stations in the United States
Chadron, Nebraska